The Patton Brothers, comprising Jimmy Elliott (20 August 1931 – 26 July 2019) and Brian Elliott (born 13 December 1933), were an English comedy double act and the two older brothers of Barry and Paul Elliott, the Chuckle Brothers. They began their career as a double act in the 1950s.

Biography
The brothers' father, Jimmy Elliott, was a comedian who later became known as Gene Patton. Jimmy and Brian grew up in Rotherham, like their brothers the Chuckle Brothers but were born in Kent. Their other brother Colin never became an actor, he was, instead, a car mechanic. Their sister, Sheila, a dancer, was married to the actor Bill Waddington.

When Jimmy left school in 1946, he joined "Britain's Dead End Kids" and appeared in five pantomimes before Brian joined him. The brothers got their big break in 1956 when they performed in Aladdin as Chinese policemen. Over the course of their career they appeared alongside British pantomime favourites such as Barbara Windsor, Ronnie Corbett and John Inman.

Both Jimmy and Brian made appearances in the children's television series ChuckleVision alongside their younger brothers Paul and Barry. Jimmy's character was known as "No Slacking" due to the catchphrase that he constantly used to berate the Chuckle Brothers; Brian's was known as "Get Out Of It!" for similar reasons. Prior to ChuckleVision, all four brothers had appeared together on the game show 3-2-1 in 1982 and the talent show New Faces.

In 2015, Jimmy became engaged to a 25-year-old ChuckleVision fan whom he had met via Facebook. The couple married in 2017.

Jimmy died in July 2019, aged 87.

References

External links

1931 births
1933 births
2019 deaths
20th-century English male actors
21st-century English male actors
Comedians from Yorkshire
English comedy duos
English male comedians
English male stage actors
English male television actors
Living people
Male actors from Yorkshire
British parodists
Actors from Rotherham
Sibling duos
Slapstick comedians